Lisle is an unincorporated community in western Cass County, in the U.S. state of Missouri and is part of the Kansas City metropolitan area within the United States.

The community lies within one mile of the Missouri-Kansas state line. It is on Missouri Route D between Drexel to the south and West Line to the north. Coldwater Creek lies to the south and east and its tributary, Cave Spring Creek, is to the north.

History
Lisle was platted in 1892, taking the name of J. D. Lisle, the original owner of the town site.  A post office called Lisle was established in 1891, and remained in operation until 1954.

References

Unincorporated communities in Cass County, Missouri
Unincorporated communities in Missouri